Anacondas or water boas are a group of large snakes of the genus Eunectes. They are found in tropical South America. Four species are currently recognized.

Description
Although the name applies to a group of snakes, it is often used to refer only to one species, in particular, the common or green anaconda (Eunectes murinus), which is the largest snake in the world by weight, and the second longest after the reticulated python.

Etymology
The South American names anacauchoa and anacaona were suggested in an account by Peter Martyr d'Anghiera, but the idea of a South American origin was questioned by Henry Walter Bates who, in his travels in South America, failed to find any similar name in use. Ray used a catalogue of snakes from the Leyden museum supplied by Dr. Tancred Robinson, but the description of its habit was based on Andreas Cleyer who in 1684 described a gigantic snake that crushed large animals by coiling around their bodies and crushing their bones. Henry Yule in his Hobson-Jobson notes that the word became more popular due to a piece of fiction published in 1768 in the Scots Magazine by a certain R. Edwin. Edwin that described a 'tiger' being crushed to death by an anaconda, when there actually never were any tigers in Sri Lanka. Yule and Frank Wall noted that the snake was in fact a python and suggested a Tamil origin  meaning elephant killer. A Sinhalese origin was also suggested by Donald Ferguson who pointed out that the word  ( lightning/large and  stem/trunk) was used in Sri Lanka for the small whip snake (Ahaetulla pulverulenta) and somehow got misapplied to the python before myths were created.

The name commonly used for the anaconda in Brazil is sucuri, sucuriju or sucuriuba.

Species and other uses of the term "anaconda" 
The term "anaconda" has been used to refer to:

 Any member of the genus Eunectes, a group of large, aquatic snakes found in South America:
 Eunectes murinus, the green anaconda – the largest species, found east of the Andes in Colombia, Venezuela, the Guianas, Ecuador, Peru, Bolivia, Brazil and Trinidad and Tobago
 Eunectes notaeus, the yellow anaconda – a small species, found in eastern Bolivia, southern Brazil, Paraguay, and northeastern Argentina
 Eunectes deschauenseei, the darkly-spotted anaconda – a rare species, found in northeastern Brazil and coastal French Guiana
 Eunectes beniensis, the Bolivian anaconda – the most recently defined species, found in the Departments of Beni and Pando in Bolivia
 The term was previously applied imprecisely, indicating any large snake that constricts its prey, though this usage is now archaic.
 "Anaconda" is also used as a metaphor for an action aimed at constricting and suffocating an opponent – for example, the Anaconda Plan proposed at the beginning of the American Civil War, in which the Union Army was to effectively "suffocate" the Confederacy. Another example is the anaconda choke in the martial art Brazilian jiu-jitsu, which is performed by wrapping your arms under the opponent's neck and through the armpit, and grasping the biceps of the opposing arm, when caught in this move, you will lose consciousness if you do not tap out.

See also
 South American jaguar, a competitor or predator

Notes

References

Eunectes
Snake common names